Przylaski  is a village in the administrative district of Gmina Brzeźnica, within Żagań County, Lubusz Voivodeship, in western Poland.

The village has a population of 226.

References

Przylaski